Toni Reber (born 16 August 1945) is a Swiss fencer. He competed in the team sabre event at the 1972 Summer Olympics.

References

1945 births
Living people
Swiss male fencers
Olympic fencers of Switzerland
Fencers at the 1972 Summer Olympics